Lorenz Magaard (May 21, 1934 – July 1, 2020) was a German-American mathematician and oceanographer. He made essential contributions to the theory of ocean waves and earned particular credit for organizing education and research.

Life 
Born in Germany, Magaard attended school in Flensburg from 1944 to 1955 and then studied mathematics and physics at Kiel University. He received the degrees of Diplom in 1961 and Dr. rer. nat. in 1963 at this university. He joined the Institute of Marine Research at Kiel University as research scientist in 1961, as lecturer (German: dozent) from 1969 and as Professor of Oceanography from 1972. He moved to the University of Hawaiʻi at Mānoa, Honolulu, USA, in 1975 and has been a Professor of Oceanography there to this date, since 2009 as Emeritus Professor.

Scientific work 
After the start in mathematics with a doctoral thesis on the embedding of Riemannian spaces into Einstein spaces and conformally-euclidean spaces, the theory of ocean waves was in the focus of most of Magaard’s ensuing research. During his work in Kiel, the dominating topics were internal wave research in the stratified Baltic Sea and their generation and the seiche system in the Baltic Sea. After moving to Honolulu, wave studies were extended to other regions. Other research concerned the eddy (fluid dynamics) energy in the ocean and shear flow instabilities in the western Pacific Ocean. His publications comprise 7 contributions to books and 38 articles in refereed journals. In teaching, both in Kiel and Honolulu, he dealt with surface and internal waves in the ocean, the tide, turbulence and dimensional analysis. He added the topic of ocean governance at the University of Hawaiʻi.

Offices 

At the University of Hawai'i:

 Chair, Graduate Field of Study in Oceanography, 1984 - 1990
 Chair, Department of Oceanography, 1984 – 1990
 Acting Associate Dean, School of Ocean and Earth Science and Technology (SOEST), 1989 – 1991
 Acting Dean, SOEST, 1999
 Associate Dean, SOEST, 1992 – 2000
 Director of Education, Marine Bioproducts Engineering Center, 2000 – 2001
 Chair, Department of Oceanography, 2005 – 2006
 Director, International Center for Climate and Society, from 2003 
 Executive Associate Director, International Pacific Research Center (IPRC), 1998 – 2008

Awards 

 Liège University Medal, Liège, Belgium, 1973
 PACON (Pacific Congress on Marine Science and Technology) Service Award, 1998; PACON International Award, 2000; PACON Fellow Award, 2007
 Fellow, Marine Technology Society, 2001

Publications 

English translations of German titles are given in brackets.

References 

:de:Lorenz Magaard

1934 births
2020 deaths
German oceanographers
American oceanographers
German emigrants to the United States
Academic staff of the University of Kiel
People from Flensburg